The Mucuim River is a river in Brazil, a tributary of the Purus River.

Course

The Mucuim river flows through the Mapinguari National Park, a  conservation unit created in 2008.
To the north of the national park it is crossed by the Trans-Amazonian Highway (BR-230), then runs through the Balata-Tufari National Forest before joining the Purus.
The river flows through the Purus-Madeira moist forests ecoregion in its upper reaches.
It flows through the Purus várzea ecoregion before joining the Purus.

See also
List of rivers of Amazonas

References

Sources

Rivers of Amazonas (Brazilian state)